Chlorocalymma is a genus of Tanzanian plants in the grass family. The only known species is Chlorocalymma cryptacanthum, native to the Iringa Region of central Tanzania.

The name is from the Greek words chloros (green) and kalymma (covering).

See also 
 List of Poaceae genera

References 

Panicoideae
Endemic flora of Tanzania
Monotypic Poaceae genera